Cafe Bahar opened in 1973 is a hotel located in Basheerbagh, Hyderabad, India. The restaurant is also famous for its Hyderabadi Biryani, Hyderabadi haleem etc.

References

External links
 

Restaurants in Hyderabad, India
1973 establishments in Andhra Pradesh
Restaurants established in 1973